Michael J. Moritz Jr. is a Grammy Award nominee, Tony Award winner, an Emmy Award winner, American theatrical producer, record producer, music supervisor, music director, arranger, Broadway music supervisor, performer and pianist.  Michael's work as a pianist, music director and arranger is featured on many recordings in the pop and musical theatre genres. Michael is on the Board of Directors for The Angel Band Project.

Early life 
Michael is originally from Youngstown, Ohio.

Career 
Most recently, Michael received the 2019 Tony Award for Best Musical as a co-producer for Broadway's Hadestown and the 2017 Emmy Award for Audio for his work on From Broadway with Love: A Benefit Concert for Orlando. He also received both TONY and Olivier award nominations as a co producer for Broadway/West End's Beautiful: The Carole King Musical.  Other notable Broadway producing credits include Big Fish, A Night With Janis Joplin, On The Town, and The Velocity of Autumn. Michael has musically directed 200+ theatrical productions throughout the US and UK.  Known as the ‘Musical Director to the Stars,’ Michael has received high praise for his music direction and performance piano work in both Broadway and Pop arenas. Michael was seen on the Broadway stage as on-stage piano and vocals in A Night With Janis Joplin. In 2017, Michael was nominated for an Emmy Award for his work as audio engineer for the DVD release of the show.
Michael has music directed, produced and performed with notable performers including Stephen Schwartz, Sara Bareilles, Carole King, Bernadette Peters, Audra McDonald, Sean Hayes, Lin-Manuel Miranda, Matthew Broderick, Andrea Martin, Rosie O'Donnell, Marissa Jaret Winokur, Alice Ripley, Sarah Jessica Parker, Whoopi Goldberg, Billy Porter, Len Cariou, Tommy Tune, Renée Elise Goldsberry, Jessie Mueller, Kimiko Glenn, Orfeh, Rosie Perez, Kelli O'Hara, Lillias White, Carmen Cusack, Andréa Burns, Keala Settle,  Marc Shaiman, Frank Wildhorn, Micky Dolenz, Tituss Burgess, Ace Young, Diana DeGarmo, Michael Cerveris, Norbert Leo Butz, James Monroe Iglehart, Aaron Tveit, Tiffany, Brandi Carlile, Richard Kind, Lena Hall, Robin DeJesus, Andrea McArdle, Chip Zien, Billy Magnussen, MacKenzie Mauzy, Lilla Crawford, Jeff Goldblum, Brian Stokes Mitchell, Laura Osnes, Lesli Margherita, Michael Cerveris, Christopher Sieber, The Muppets, Sesame Street, Ahrens and Flaherty, Linda Eder, Mary Testa, Julia Murney, Nikki Blonsky, Claybourne Elder, Melissa van der Shyff, Bobby Steggert, Capathia Jenkins, Christine Ebersole, Mimi Bessette, Phillip Boykin, Vince Oddo, Ben Hope, Randy Rainbow and Krystal Joy Brown.

Broadway productions 
 Big Fish, 2013 - 2013 Producer 
 A Night With Janis Joplin, 2013 - 2014 Producer 
 Beautiful the Carole King Musical, 2013 - Producer
 The Velocity of Autumn, 2014 - 2014 Producer 
 On the Town, 2014 - 2015 Producer 
Hadestown, 2019 - Producer

West End productions 
 Beautiful the Carole King Musical, 2015 - 2017 Producer

Australian productions 
 Beautiful the Carole King Musical, 2017 - Producer

Touring productions 
 Evita North American Tour, 2013 Producer 
 Beautiful the Carole King Musical First National Tour, 2015 Producer 
 A Night With Janis Joplin, 2016 Music Supervisor

Awards and nominations 
Stephen Schwartz's Snapshots: 2022 Grammy Award Nomination for Best Musical Theater Album
Hadestown: 2019 Tony Award for Best Musical 
Hadestown: 2019 Outer Critics Circle Award for Outstanding New Broadway Musical 
From Broadway With Love: A Benefit Concert for Orlando: 2017 Emmy Award for Audio 
 Beautiful the Carole King Musical (Broadway): 2014 Tony Nomination for Best Musical
 Beautiful the Carole King Musical (Broadway): 2014 Drama Desk Nomination for Outstanding Musical
 Beautiful the Carole King Musical Original Broadway Cast Recording: Won Grammy for Best Musical Theater Album
 Beautiful the Carole King Musical (West End): Olivier Nomination for Best New Musical
 On the Town: 2015 Tony Nomination for Best Revival of a Musical 
 On the Town: 2015 Drama Desk Nomination for Outstanding Revival of a Musical or Revue

Discography 

|-
|Aug 20, 2021
|My Marcello - concept recording
|Producer
|-

Philanthropy 
Michael is active with The Angel Band Project, a non-profit organization that supports victims of sexual assault through music therapy and outreach, both as a music director and board member. He is also active with the No Bully Organization. Michael also produced the track "What the World Needs Now Is Love" for Broadway for Orlando. He played the piano during the live performance of the song on "Maya and Marty" on June 21, 2016. In 2018, Michael served as music director and conductor for "From Broadway with Love: A Benefit Concert for Parkland," a benefit concert following the shooting at Marjory Stoneman Douglas High School.

References

External links 
 
 
 
 Michael J. Moritz Jr. at AllMusic 
 

American musical theatre producers
Living people
American male conductors (music)
People from Youngstown, Ohio
Broadway theatre producers
Broadway music directors
American male pianists
21st-century American conductors (music)
21st-century American pianists
21st-century American male musicians
Year of birth missing (living people)